Charles Edward Louis John Sylvester Maria Casimir Stuart (31 December 1720 – 30 January 1788) was the elder son of James Francis Edward Stuart, grandson of James II and VII, and the Stuart claimant to the thrones of England, Scotland and Ireland from 1766 as Charles III. During his lifetime, he was also known as "the Young Pretender" and "the Young Chevalier"; in popular memory, he is known as Bonnie Prince Charlie.

Born in Rome to the exiled Stuart court, he spent much of his early and later life in Italy. In 1744, he travelled to France to take part in a planned invasion to restore the Stuart monarchy under his father. When the French fleet was partly wrecked by storms, Charles resolved to proceed to Scotland following discussion with leading Jacobites. This resulted in Charles landing by ship on the west coast of Scotland, leading to the Jacobite rising of 1745. The Jacobite forces under Charles initially achieved several victories in the field, including the Battle of Prestonpans in September 1745 and the Battle of Falkirk Muir in January 1746. However, by April 1746, Charles was defeated at Culloden, which effectively ended the Stuart cause. While there were subsequent attempts such as a planned French invasion in 1759, Charles was unable to restore the Stuart monarchy.

With the Jacobite cause lost, Charles spent the remainder of his life on the continent, except for one secret visit to London. On his return, Charles lived briefly in France before he was exiled in 1748 under the terms of the Treaty of Aix-la-Chapelle. Charles eventually returned to Italy, where he spent much of his later life living in Florence and Rome. He had a number of mistresses before marrying Princess Louise of Stolberg-Gedern in 1772. In his later life, Charles's health declined greatly and he was said to be an alcoholic. However, his escapades during the 1745 and 1746 uprising, as well as his escape from Scotland, led to his portrayal as a romantic figure of heroic failure. His life and the once possible prospects of a restored Stuart monarchy have left an enduring historical legend that continues to have a legacy today.

Early life

Childhood and education: 1720–1734

Charles was born in the Palazzo Muti in Rome, Italy, on 31 December 1720, where his father had been given a residence by Pope Clement XI. Historians differ as to who carried out his baptism ceremony. Kybett reports that it was presided over by Pope Clement, whereas Douglas and Pininski state it was carried out by the Bishop of Montefiascone. Regardless, he was given the names Charles for his great-grandfather, Edward after Edward the Confessor, Louis for the King of France, Casimir after the Kings of Poland and Sylvester as he was born on Saint Sylvester's Day.

Charles was the son of the Old Pretender, James Francis Edward Stuart (himself son of the exiled Stuart King James II and VII), and Maria Clementina Sobieska, a Polish noblewoman (the granddaughter of John III Sobieski). Charles Edward's grandfather, James II of England and Ireland and VII of Scotland, ruled the kingdoms from 1685 to 1688. He was deposed when the English Parliament invited the Dutch Protestant William III and his wife, Princess Mary, King James's eldest daughter, to replace him in the Revolution of 1688. Many Protestants, including a number of prominent parliamentarians, had been worried that King James aimed to return England fully to the Catholic faith. Since the exile of James and the Act of Settlement, the "Jacobite Cause" had striven to return the Stuarts to the thrones of England and Scotland, which had been united in 1603 under James VI and I, with the parliaments joined by the Acts of Union in 1707 as the Kingdom of Great Britain.

Charles was said to have suffered from weak legs at an early age, potentially as a result of rickets. However, Charles was instructed in a regime of exercise and dancing to help improve his constitution, which strengthened his legs by later years. Charles spent much of his early childhood in Rome and Bologna in the environment of a small retinue and a close but often argumentative family. His brother Henry Benedict Stuart was born 5 years later on 6 March 1725. His mother and father were regularly at disagreement with each other, leading to one notable incident in which Clementina left the palace shortly after Henry's birth in 1725 and moved to a convent, not returning until 1727. As the legitimate heirs to the thrones of England, Scotland, and Ireland—according to the Jacobite succession, James and his household lived with a sense of pride, and staunchly believed in the divine right of kings. Charles spent much of his early years in the company of older men, several of which acted as his tutors. Charles Edward's governor was the Protestant James Murray, Jacobite Earl of Dunbar. While the pope had raised initial concerns over Charles's religious education under a Protestant governor, James agreed that Charles would be raised as a Catholic. Among his tutors were the Chevalier Ramsay, Sir Thomas Sheridan and Father Vinceguerra, a Catholic priest. He quickly became conversant in English, French and Italian, although it was said that he never fully mastered any language and was partially illiterate. During his childhood, he was reported to enjoy hunting, horsemanship, a form of golf, music and dancing.

Travels in Europe: 1734–1745

In 1734, his cousin, the Duke of Liria, who was proceeding to join Don Carlos in his struggle for the crown of Naples, passed through Rome. He offered to take Charles on his expedition, and the boy of thirteen was appointed general of artillery by Don Carlos. On 30 July 1734, he departed Rome with an escort and proceeded with his cousin to the French and Spanish siege of Gaeta, his first exposure to war. While at Gaeta, he observed the final stages of the siege and was said to have come under fire in the trenches of the siegeworks. He returned to Rome in late 1734. In January 1735, shortly after his fourteenth birthday, Charles's mother Clementina died of scurvy. She had been in a poor state of declining health for many months, however, Charles was said to have been deeply distressed after his mother passed.

As Charles grew older, he was introduced by his father and the pope to Italian society. In 1737, James sent his son on a tour through major Italian cities to complete his education as a prince and man of the world. Charles proceeded to visit Genoa, Florence, Parma, Bologna and Venice. The Italian tour was a shock for Charles, who had believed he would be welcomed as a royal prince. Instead, most European courts would only receive him as the "Duke of Albany" (an historic title adopted by Scottish royals in the 14th century). Despite being Catholic, many European states wished to avoid antagonising Britain, the only exception being Venice. By the time he had reached 20, he had become a notable member of upper-class society in Rome and had developed a fondness for alcohol and fine clothes, often in excess of his allowance. He had become increasingly distant from his brother due to Henry's devotion to prayer and religious study. His father continued to rely on foreign aid in his attempts to restore himself to the British and Irish thrones. However, Charles became increasingly supportive of the idea of rebellion unassisted by invasion or by support of any kind from abroad. On 23 December 1743, owing to his limited ability to travel to Britain, James named his son Charles prince regent, giving him the authority to act in his name.

In January 1744, his father believed he had managed to obtain the de facto renewed support of the French government. Following this mistaken belief, Charles Edward travelled covertly to France from Rome, initially under the guise of a hunting party. However, neither the French Government or King Louis XV had officially invited Charles. However, by February, the French government had agreed to support a planned invasion of England, hoping to remove British forces from the War of the Austrian Succession. Charles then travelled to Dunkirk with the purpose of accompanying a French Army across to England. The invasion never materialised, as the French fleet was scattered by a storm in the spring equinox, losing 11 ships. By the time it regrouped, the British fleet realised the diversion that had deceived them and resumed their position in the Channel.

After the failure of the planned invasion, Charles remained in France, staying at several places, including Gravelines, Chantilly and Paris, leasing a hilltop house in Montmartre in May 1744. Owing to his expenditure on his wardrobe, attendants and drinking, Charles became in debt to the amount of 30,000 livres. With news of this and following the failed invasion, the French attempted to encourage Charles to return to Italy by refusing to pay him a monthly subsidy. However, when he could no longer afford the rent on the house in Montmartre, the Archbishop of Cambrai agreed to lend him his country estate near Paris where he stayed until January 1745. Charles then moved to the country house of Anne, Duchess of Berwick in Soissons, following repeated attempts by the French to encourage him to leave the Paris region. However, Charles continued to travel regularly to Paris during this period, often incognito and frequenting the hotels of the city to meet with supporters.

1745 uprising

Preparations and journey to Scotland: 1745

In both Rome and Paris, Charles met numerous supporters of the Stuart cause; he was aware that there were Jacobites representatives in every key European court. He had now taken a considerable share in correspondence and other actual work connected with the promotion of his own and his father's interests. While in Paris and Soissons, Charles sought funding and support for the restoration of the monarchy. Following conversations with Irish and Scottish exiles such as Sir Thomas Sheridan who assured him of the strength of the Jacobite movement in Scotland, as well as following receipt of a petition to Charles from Sir Hector Maclean on behalf of intervention, Charles resolved to launch an expedition to Scotland. The ultimate aim was to instigate a rebellion that would place his father on the thrones of England, Scotland and Ireland. To assist with funding the expedition, Charles borrowed some 180,000 livres from the Paris bankers John Waters and George Waters. Part of these funds had been raised through support from loyalists in Britain such as Sir Henry Bedingfield of Oxburgh Hall. As security for the loans, Charles was able to use the Sobieski crown jewels of his great-grandfather John III Sobieski, which had passed down to him through his mother. He used these extensive funds to purchase weapons and fit out the Elisabeth, an old man-of-war of 66 guns, and the Du Teillay (sometimes called Doutelle), a 16-gun privateer.

Encouraged by the French victory in May 1745 at the Battle of Fontenoy, Charles and his party set sail on 5 July for Scotland. During the voyage north, Charles's squadron were fired upon by HMS Lion in the Celtic Sea. The Du Teillay, with Charles on board, made sail to escape, while the Elisabeth, with her greater firepower, engaged Lion. When Lion withdrew, the Elisabeth was forced to return to Brest for repairs, taking the majority of Charles's supplies, including some 1,800 broadswords, 8 artillery pieces and most of the 1,500 muskets he had purchased. The Du Teillay successfully landed him and seven companions at Eriskay on 23 July 1745. The group would later be known as the Seven Men of Moidart and included John O'Sullivan, an Irish exile and former French officer, and Charles's secretary George Kelly. Many Highland clans, both Catholic and Protestant, still supported the Jacobite cause, and Charles hoped for a warm welcome from these clans to start an insurgency by Jacobites throughout Britain. However, receiving a cool reception from the clan leaders there, many of those contacted advised him to return to France, including MacDonald of Sleat and Norman MacLeod. Aware of the potential impact of defeat, they felt that by arriving without French military support, Charles had failed to keep his commitments and were unconvinced by his personal qualities. Undeterred, Charles set sail again and arrived at the bay of Loch nan Uamh. He had hoped for support from a French fleet, but it was not forthcoming and he decided to raise an army in Scotland.

Early stages and victory at Prestonpans: 1745
Although several clan chiefs initially discouraged him, he gained the crucial support of Donald Cameron of Lochiel after Charles provided "security for the full value of his estate should the rising prove abortive." Thereafter, support continued to grow. It is recorded that during this time, Charles began to take lessons in conversational Gaelic under the tutorship of Alasdair mac Mhaighstir Alasdair. On 19 August, he raised his father's standard at Glenfinnan and gathered a force large enough to enable him to march towards Edinburgh. The force proceeded eastwards, reaching Invergarry Castle by the last week of August. Charles's forces continued on via the Corrieyairack Pass, where their control of the pass persuaded advancing government forces to withdraw from the area. Stopping briefly first at Blair Castle, Charles and his forces reached Perth on 4 September. At Perth, his ranks were joined by more sympathisers, including Lord George Murray. Previously pardoned for his participation in the 1715 and 1719 risings, Murray took over from O'Sullivan due to his better understanding of Highland military customs and the Jacobites spent the next week re-organising their forces. On 14 September, Charles and his forces took Falkirk and Charles stayed at Callendar House, where he persuaded the Earl of Kilmarnock to join him.

Charles's progress onto Edinburgh was helped by the action of the British leader, General Sir John Cope, who had marched to Inverness, leaving the south country undefended. On 16 September, Charles and his army encamped outside the city at Gray's Mill in Longstone. Lord Provost Archibald Stewart controlled the city, which quickly surrendered, although the castle under the command of George Preston did not surrender and was blockaded until Charles later called off the siege owing to a lack of artillery. On 17 September, Charles entered Edinburgh, accompanied by around 2,400 men. During this time, Charles also gave trophies to his supporters, a prominent example being Prince Charlie's Targe. Allan Ramsay painted a portrait of Charles while he was in Edinburgh, which survived in the collection of the Earl of Wemyss at Gosford House and, was on display at the Scottish National Portrait Gallery. 

Meanwhile, Sir John Cope had brought his forces by sea to Dunbar, a decision he would soon regret. On 20 September, Charles mustered and joined his forces at Duddingston. On 21 September, Charles and his forces defeated Cope's army, the only government army in Scotland, at the Battle of Prestonpans. Charles was said to have been only 50 paces from the front-line of the battle, and he later expressed remorse that the victory involved killing his own subjects. It was reported during the battle that Charles and Lord Murray had argued with each other over the disposition of forces. The historian Hugh Douglas argues this was to result in an ever worsening relationship between the two that would culminate with ultimate defeat later at Culloden.

Invasion of England: 1745–1746
Morale was high following the battle at Prestonpans, and Charles returned to Edinburgh, holding court at Holyrood Palace. Jacobite morale was further boosted in mid-October when the French landed with supplies of money and weapons, together with an envoy, which seemed to validate claims of French backing. However, Lord Elcho later claimed that his fellow Scots were already concerned by Charles's autocratic style and fears he was overly influenced by his Irish advisors. A "Prince's Council" of senior leaders was established; Charles resented it as an imposition by the Scots on their divinely appointed monarch, while the daily meetings accentuated divisions between the factions. The council was said to include Perth, Lord George Murray, Thomas Sheridan, John O'Sullivan, Murray of Broughton, Lochiel, Keppoch, Clanranald, Glencoe, Ardsheal and Lochgarry. After much discussion, Charles persuaded his council to agree to an invasion of England. By November, Charles was marching south at the head of an army numbering approximately 6,000 men. On 10 November, Carlisle surrendered to Charles. Continuing south, Charles and his army reached Penrith on 21 November, then Preston on the 26 November and Manchester on the 29 November. His army progressed as far south as Swarkestone Bridge in Derbyshire, arriving there on the 4 December.

After reaching Derbyshire, despite Charles's objections, his council decided to return to Scotland given the lack of English Jacobite and French support, as well as rumours that large government forces were being amassed. Charles admitted that he had not heard from the English Jacobites since leaving France despite claiming the contrary; this caused his relationship with some of the Scots to become irretrievably damaged. On 6 December, the Jacobites and Charles left Derby and began their march north back to Scotland. Charles's route north was the same as the one that he had taken on the journey south. He returned to Manchester on 9 December and after some light resistance from the local population, Charles demanded £5,000 from the town, eventually receiving £2,500 in payment. Charles then proceeded on through Preston, Lancaster and Kendal, until the Jacobite forces eventually met the government forces at Clifton in Cumbria on 18 December. The Jacobite forces would go onto win the skirmish at Clifton Moor allowing them to continue north through Carlisle and back into Scotland. 

Charles and his forces then reached Glasgow on 26 December where they rested until 3 January 1746. The decision was then made to lay siege to Stirling and Stirling Castle. However, while the town surrendered immediately, the castle's artillery proved too strong for the Jacobite forces to approach and seize the castle. Government forces also attempted a relief of the siege, which resulted in a victory for Charles in the ensuing Battle of Falkirk Muir in January 1746. A failure to take the castle, however, resulted in the abandonment of the siege and the Jacobite forces moving northward to Crieff then Inverness. With a halt in operations until the weather improved, Charles forces then rested at Inverness, but they were later pursued by the forces of George II's son Prince William, Duke of Cumberland.

Culloden and return to France: 1746

The British forces caught up with Charles and his army at the ensuing Battle of Culloden on 16 April. Charles ignored the advice of general Lord George Murray and chose to fight on flat, open, marshy ground, where his forces were exposed to superior government firepower. To ensure his safety, his officers requested that Charles command his army from a position behind the front lines, which prevented him from gaining a clear view of the battlefield. He hoped that Cumberland's army would attack first, and he had his men stand exposed to the accurate fire of the British artillery. Seeing the error in this, he quickly ordered an attack, but his messenger was killed before the order could be delivered. The Jacobite attack was uncoordinated, charging into withering musket fire and grapeshot fired from the cannons, and it was met with little success. In the center, the Jacobites reached the bayonets of the redcoats, but they were shot down by a second line of soldiers. The remaining Jacobite survivors in the front line then fled. However, the north-eastern regiments, as well as Irish and Scots regulars in the second line, retired in good order, allowing Charles and his personal retinue to escape northwards. 

After the defeat, Murray managed to lead a group of Jacobites to Ruthven, intending to continue the fight. Charles thought that he was betrayed, however, and decided to abandon the Jacobite cause. Some 20 miles from the battlefield, Charles rested briefly at Gorthleck, the home of his dubious supporter Lord Lovat, before retreating to Invergarry Castle, by way of Fort Augustus, on 16 April. Charles then hid in the moors of the Highlands of Scotland, before making a flight to the Hebrides, always barely ahead of the government forces. Many Highlanders aided him during his escape, and none of them betrayed him for the £30,000 reward. Charles was assisted by supporters such as the pilot Donald Macleod of Galtrigill and Captain Con O'Neill, who took him to Benbecula. From 16 April until 28 June, Charles travelled through Benbecula, South Uist, North Uist, Harris, and the Isle of Lewis. On 28 June, Charles was aided by Flora MacDonald, who helped him sail to the Isle of Skye by taking him in a boat disguised as her maid "Betty Burke". Charles remained on Skye until July, when he then crossed back to the mainland. With the aid of a few loyal servants and local supporters, Charles hid from government forces in the western Grampian Mountains for several weeks. He ultimately evaded capture and on 19 September, he left the country aboard the French frigate L'Heureux, commanded by Richard Warren. The Prince's Cairn marks the traditional spot on the shores of Loch nan Uamh in Lochaber from which he made his final departure from Scotland.

Later life

Life in Europe: 1746–1766
On his return, he was initially received warmly by King Louis XV, but as far as obtaining additional military or political assistance was concerned, his efforts proved fruitless. However, he became at once the popular hero and idol of many Parisians on account of his exploits in Scotland. In March 1747, he travelled briefly to Madrid via Lyon for an audience with Ferdinand VI of Spain, but the King rejected the idea of Spain providing help to restore the Stuarts. His relationship with his brother Henry deteriorated during this time, when Henry accepted a cardinal's hat in July 1747. He also deliberately broke off communication with his father in Rome (who had approved of his brother's action). 

While back in France, Charles had numerous mistresses. He had a relationship with his first cousin Marie Louise de La Tour d'Auvergne, wife of Jules, Prince of Guéméné, that resulted in a short-lived son named Charles (born 28 July 1748, died 18 January 1749). In December 1748, he was arrested by the French authorities while attending the opera at the Théâtre du Palais-Royal. Briefly imprisoned at the Château de Vincennes, he was then expelled from France under the terms of the Treaty of Aix-la-Chapelle that ended the War of the Austrian Succession. He moved first to the Papal territory at Avignon, and then in 1749 to Lunéville in the Duchy of Lorraine. In the following years, he was reported to have made several visits in secret to Paris, but was not discovered by the French authorities.

After his defeat, Charles indicated to the remaining supporters of the Jacobite cause in England that, accepting the impossibility of his recovering the English and Scottish crowns while he remained a Roman Catholic, he was willing to commit himself to reigning as a Protestant. Accordingly, he visited London incognito in 1750, staying for several weeks primarily at the Essex Street London residence of Lady Primrose, the widow of the 3rd Viscount of Primrose. While in London, Charles abjured the Roman Catholic faith, and conformed to the Protestant faith by receiving Anglican communion, likely at one of the remaining non-juring chapels. Bishop Robert Gordon, a staunch Jacobite whose house in Theobald's Row was one of Charles's safe-houses for the visit, is the most likely to have celebrated the communion, and a chapel in Gray's Inn was suggested as the venue as early as 1788. This is said to rebutt David Hume's suggestion that it was a church in the Strand. However, biographers such as Kybett have argued the ceremony was carried out at St Martin-in-the-Fields.

Charles lived for several years in exile with his Scottish mistress, Clementina Walkinshaw (later known as Countess von Alberstrof), whom he met, and may have begun a relationship with, during the 1745 rebellion. She was suspected by many of Charles's supporters of being a spy planted by the Hanoverian government of Great Britain. On 29 October 1753, the couple had a daughter, Charlotte. Charles's inability to cope with the collapse of the Jacobite cause led to his problem with alcohol, and mother and daughter separated from Charles with his father James's assistance.

In 1759, at the height of the Seven Years' War, Charles was summoned to a meeting in Paris with the French foreign minister, the Duc De Choiseul. Charles failed to make a good impression, being argumentative and idealistic in his expectations. Choiseul was planning a full-scale invasion of England involving upwards of 100,000 men, to which he hoped to add a number of Jacobites led by Charles. However, he was so little impressed with Charles that he dismissed the prospect of Jacobite assistance. The French invasion, which was Charles's last realistic chance to recover the thrones of England, Scotland and Ireland for the Stuart dynasty, was ultimately thwarted by naval defeats at Quiberon Bay and Lagos.

Pretender: 1766–1788

In 1766, Charles's father died. Pope Clement XI had recognised James as King of England, Scotland, and Ireland as "James III and VIII", but over 40 years later Pope Clement XIII did not give Charles the same recognition as "Charles III". However, on 23 January, with the pope's permission, Charles moved into the Palazzo Muti, which his father had lived in for over 40 years. Charles wrote to both the Kings of France and Spain on his accession, but recognition as King Charles III was not granted by either monarch. Charles returned to his social life in Rome, making visits to the pope and indulging in pastimes such as hunting, shooting, balls, concerts and plays. However, he would periodically shut himself away in his rooms, and was said to have formed no new friendships in his later life. He made visits to Florence and Pisa in 1770, where he took to the waters at the city's thermal baths. Charles returned to Paris in early 1771 with the permission of the French authorities under the Duc de Choiseul, who once again wished to discuss the possibility of a Jacobite invasion. However, on the day of the meeting, Charles was reported to be so intoxicated that he was unable to speak coherently, so the discussions were abandoned.

By the time Charles entered his 51st year, concern was raised by his Jacobite supporters and the French that he had not yet married, and that only his brother, a priest sworn to celibacy, remained as the only male heir. The French also wished to continue the Stuart line as a potential weapon against the government in Britain. In 1771, while he was in Paris, Charles dispatched Sir Edmund Ryan, an Irish officer in Berwick's regiment, to seek out a bride for him. Despite some potential negotiations with prospective brides, he was unable to find a wife. A few months later, Charles's companion, the Duc d'Aiguillion, and his cousin Charles Fitz-James Stuart suggested the latter's sister-in-law Princess Louise of Stolberg-Gedern as a prospective bride. Accordingly, on 28 March 1772, Charles married Princess Louise by proxy. The couple met shortly after for the first time at Macerata on 17 April 1772, where the marriage was reported to have been consummated.

They lived first in Rome and then moved to Florence in 1774, where he was provided with a residence by Prince Corsini, the Palazzo di San Clemente, now known as the Palazzo del Pretendente. In Florence, he used the title "Count of Albany" as an alias, and his wife Louise was normally referred to as the "Countess of Albany". Charles's health deteriorated in later life, and he was reported to have suffered from asthma, high blood pressure, swollen legs and ulcers. In 1744, while in Florence, he suffered constantly from his illnesses, which required him to be carried by his servants to and from his carriage. Charles was also known to be an alcoholic, a condition that worsened with age.

Charles and Louise left Florence in 1777 and returned to Rome. Their relationship had become increasingly quarrelsome. One cause was said to be the speculation regarding Louise's adulterous relationships with the courtiers Carl Bonstetten and the Italian poet count Vittorio Alfieri. Another cause was stated to be Charles himself, who was reported as becoming increasingly irrational and drunk. In November 1780, Louise formally left Charles. After separating, she claimed that Charles had physically abused her. This claim was generally believed by contemporaries. The historian Douglas states that Charles had been drinking following Saint Andrew's Day celebrations, and after accusing Louise of infidelities, may have attempted to rape her, resulting in her screaming to the extent that the household servants intervened. In the years that followed, the pope awarded Louise half of Charles's papal pension, and Charles's international reputation was greatly damaged. He was said to live an increasingly isolated and unhappy life, especially after his brother Henry agreed to house Louise at his estate.

By 1783, Charles's health continued to decline, and for a time, he fell seriously ill such to the extent that he was given the Sacraments. Although Charles recovered, he agreed to create a new will, and signed an act of legitimation for his illegitimate daughter Charlotte. Charles also gave her the title "Duchess of Albany" in the peerage of Scotland and the style "Her Royal Highness", but these honours did not give Charlotte any right of succession to the throne. Charlotte lived with her father in Florence and Rome for the next five years. Eventually, she survived her father by less than two years, dying unmarried at Bologna in November 1789. In April 1784, Charles was persuaded by the visiting King Gustav III of Sweden to grant Louise a decree of separation. While not a formal divorce, as no such legal procedure existed in the Papal States, Louise was thereby legally permitted to live separately from her husband, even though she had been doing so for some time. Charles spent the majority of his last years living between Florence and Rome. However, he left Florence for the last time in 1785 and returned to Rome. It was reported that he was limited to light travelling by his doctors owing to his fragility.

Death and burial

Charles died in Rome of a stroke on 30 January 1788, aged 67. The cardinals stated officially that he died on the morning of 31 January, as it was deemed unlucky to have him declared dead on the same date as his great-grandfather, King Charles I, who had met his end on the scaffold at Whitehall Palace. Charles's will left most of his estate to his heir, his daughter Charlotte. There were a few exceptions, including some plate for his brother Henry, as well as some annuities for his servants.

On his death, a cast of his face was made, and his body was embalmed and placed in a coffin of cypress wood. Adorned with the Order of the Thistle, the Cross of St Andrew, the Order of the Garter and the Cross of St George, Charles was first buried in Frascati Cathedral near Rome, where his brother Henry was bishop. At Henry's death in 1807, Charles's remains (except his heart) were moved to the crypt of St. Peter's Basilica in the Vatican, where they were laid to rest next to those of his brother and father. This was below the spot where the monument to the Royal Stuarts by Antonio Canova would later be erected. His mother Maria is also buried nearby at St Peter's. Charles's heart remained in Frascati Cathedral, where it is contained in a small urn beneath the floor, under a monument.

Cultural depictions
Charles has been depicted in painting since the 18th century, much of it belonging to Romanticism and later Victorian representations of the Jacobites. Charles's departure from Scotland in 1746 is depicted in an engraving of a painting by Francis William Topham,  In 1892, John Pettie painted Charles entering the Ballroom at Holyroodhouse. Charles and the Jacobites would also be depicted in numerous drawings, prints and on objects, his likeness and coat of arms even depicted on objects such as engraved drinking glassess.

Charles has been depicted on stage as well as in film and television. He was portrayed by David Niven in the 1948 semi-biographical film Bonnie Prince Charlie. Charles was also portrayed by Andrew Gower in the historical dramatic series Outlander, based upon Diana Gabaldon's book series. His life has formed a component of numerous historical plays, including For Bonnie Prince Charlie (1897), the Young Pretender (1996) and The Glory (2000).

The legacy of Charles Stuart and his role in Jacobitism has also influenced songs and music. Examples include the folk songs "", "Bonnie Charlie", "Wha'll be King but Charlie?" and "Charlie is my darling". Charles's subsequent flight from Scotland is commemorated in "The Skye Boat Song" by the English author Sir Harold Edwin Boulton and in the Irish song "Mo Ghile Mear" by Seán Clárach Mac Domhnaill.

Arms

During his pretence as Prince of Wales, Charles claimed a coat of arms consisting of those of the kingdom, differenced by a label argent of three points.

Ancestry

Notes

References

Sources

External links

 Prince Charles Edward Stuart National Galleries of Scotland
 The Jacobite Rebellion, BBC Radio 4 discussion with Murray Pittock, Stana Nenadic & Allan Macinnes (In Our Time, 8 May 2003).
  by Francis William Topham, engraved for Fisher's Drawing Room Scrap Book, 1839 with a poetical illustration by Letitia Elizabeth Landon.

 
1720 births
1788 deaths
18th-century British people
Charles Edward Stuart
Scottish people of Polish descent
Collections of Derby Museum and Art Gallery
Earls in the Jacobite peerage
Charles Edward
Peers created by James Francis Edward Stuart
Nobility from Rome
People of the Jacobite rising of 1745
British Roman Catholics
Italian people of Scottish descent
Burials at St. Peter's Basilica
Knights of the Thistle
Knights of the Garter
Sobieski family
Violence against women in Italy
Jacobite pretenders